The New Orleans Hurricane of 1915 was an intense Category 4 hurricane that made landfall near Grand Isle, Louisiana, and the most intense tropical cyclone during the 1915 Atlantic hurricane season. The hurricane killed 275 people and caused $13 million (1915 US dollars) in damage.

Meteorological history

According to the Atlantic hurricane reanalysis project, the 1915 New Orleans hurricane began as a weak tropical storm moving across the southern Windward Islands on September 21, 1915. Its tropical cyclogenesis was determined via analysis of atmospheric observations from the surrounding islands, though shipping in the region would confirm the storm's existence the following day. Tracking slowly towards the west, the nascent tropical cyclone gradually strengthened, reaching hurricane intensity by 00:00 UTC on September 23. This steady phase of intensification would continue unhindered as the hurricane progressed across the Caribbean Sea, allowing the storm to reach major hurricane strength on September 24. One ship observation, estimated to have been likely taken late on September 25, documented a barometric pressure of 931 mbar (hPa; 27.50 inHg). This pressure reading would stand as the lowest taken during the hurricane's lifespan, and also suggested that the storm's initially assessed intensity—equivalent to a modern-day Category 2 hurricane—was significantly underestimated. As the cyclone passed south of Jamaica, it curved towards the northwest, taking it towards the Yucatán Channel. By September 28, the storm had entered the Gulf of Mexico.

The hurricane maintained its gradual forward speed and fairly steady intensity as it approached the Louisiana coast. As the cyclone neared land, it entered a denser area of shipping traffic, allowing the storm's intensity to be more readily assessed. Slight weakening occurred as the storm moved over shallower continental shelf waters, leading up to the hurricane's landfall on the Gulf coast of Louisiana at 18:00 UTC on September 29. The hurricane's strongest winds upon landfall were estimated to measure , correlating with the upper-end of a Category 3 rating on the modern-day Saffir–Simpson hurricane wind scale. At the time, this was the lowest pressure ever recorded in the United States. Using this measurement, the Atlantic reanalysis project calculated that the hurricane struck Louisiana with a lower pressure: . Analysis of onshore observations also suggested that the storm made landfall with concentric eyewalls. Although the moist swampland of the Louisianan Acadiana allowed the hurricane to maintain strength longer than what would otherwise be expected, the storm would eventually succumb to land interaction. Rapid weakening ensued as the cyclone moved inland, degrading back into a tropical storm within twelve hours of landfall. As it entered Mississippi, the storm began to interact with a quasi-stationary front. This resulted in the formation of a new low-pressure center and denoted the transition from a tropical to extratropical cyclone at 12:00 UTC on September 30; and these remnants advanced northeastward into the Mid-Atlantic states before they were last noted on October 1 over Pennsylvania.

Caribbean impacts
Owing to the scarcity of shipping traffic across much of the Caribbean Sea, the storm's intensity and potential track were difficult to assess early in its lifetime. Light rain from the system fell far north in Puerto Rico and the Turks and Caicos Islands, with the latter reporting  of rain. As the storm passed south of Jamaica, strong gales were felt in Kingston, Jamaica. Some winds were strong enough to cut telecommunications between Kingston and the outlying districts of the island nation. The hurricane's brushing of Jamaica led in part to raising cotton prices to a yearly high. Offshore, the United Fruit steamer Almirante sustained considerable damage but was able to return safely to Port Royal. Ships sailing for the Yucatán Channel and in western Cuban waters were warned to exercise extreme caution following the hurricane's passage of Jamaica.

United States impacts

Preparations
As potential impacts on the United States became more clear, the Weather Bureau issued storm warnings for virtually the entire extent of the Eastern Seaboard from Eastport, Maine southward to the Florida coast on September 27. Storm warnings for the Louisiana coast—where the hurricane would eventually make landfall—were first issued by the Weather Bureau on the morning of September 28 and disseminated via telegraph and mail. That afternoon, a hurricane warning was issued for coastal regions of the Gulf of Mexico from Pensacola, Florida to New Orleans, Louisiana. Extensive efforts to communicate the imminent threat the hurricane posed began in earnest following the issuance of warnings for the area, with public interests being advised that the approaching storm could be stronger than the 1909 Grand Isle hurricane, which served as New Orleans' strongest documented tropical cyclone at the time. Warnings continued into September 29, and local emergency offices enforced strict curfews for New Orleans as landfall approached; meteorologist Isaac Cline stated in an entry to the Monthly Weather Review that the effective dissemination of warnings and strict enforcement of curfew "unquestionably" mitigated additional loss of life in the city.

Gulf of Mexico and Louisiana
As the hurricane traversed the Gulf of Mexico from September 28 to September 29, it produced rough surf along its path. The cutter Miami was caught in the storm, but was able to use a heavily damaged ship as an anchor before resuming its trek towards Key West, Florida.

Storm surge and rough seas produced by the hurricane along the Louisiana coast arrived shortly before the storm made landfall. Evacuees departing the coast as late as September 28 reported no abnormal tides along the shore. However, sea levels began to rise at abnormally rapid rates on the morning of September 29 as the hurricane neared. By the afternoon hours, low-lying lands south of New Orleans and east towards Bay St. Louis, Mississippi, as well as areas adjacent to Lake Pontchartrain, were inundated by the quickly rising storm surge. Levee overtopping along Lake Pontchartrain resulted in the flooding of much of western New Orleans.

Upon making landfall, onshore anemometers documented winds stronger than had been recorded in any previous hurricane along the United States Gulf Coast. The intense winds caused extensive damage across New Orleans, where nearly every building sustained damage. The French Market was partly demolished, while the roof of a prominent Masonic temple partially collapsed. Combined with powerful waves, the winds resulted in the sinking of four small steamers at the Port of New Orleans, in addition to several coal barges. A number of other steamers and small craft were blown from bayous and bays onto dry land. The winds also caused widespread power outages, cutting telecommunications to and from the city, and putting over 8000 telephones out of commission. Electric lighting was also disabled by the storm following the failure of city's power station. Damage to city-owned property in New Orleans was appraised at nearly US$500,000, though the total amount of damage to all public and private property in the city was estimated to have been at least ten times greater at US$5 million. Damage to shipping along the Mississippi River in and around New Orleans was estimated at US$1.75 million. Following the storm's passage, rail service to New Orleans was suspended.

Roofs were blown off buildings and the Presbytère on Jackson Square lost its cupola. The clock on St. Louis Cathedral stopped at 5:50pm, the height of the storm. The hurricane damaged the Times-Picayune building, hampering newspaper production. More church steeples in the city were blown down or significantly damaged than remained intact.

The hurricane also caused significant damage in areas around New Orleans, including the destruction of 90% of buildings destroyed along Lake Pontchartrain. Only one house remained standing in Leeville, Louisiana; similar destruction occurred between Golden Meadow, Louisiana and Cut Off, Louisiana, where 100 houses were demolished. In Morgan City, Louisiana, winds of  blew down wires and crippled communication. The total damage to infrastructure in areas surrounding New Orleans was estimated at US$6.5 million.
A  storm surge rolled into St. Bernard Parish, the Rigolets, and the Lake Catherine area.

Areas along the Lower Coast (south of New Orleans) were hit even harder than the city. A telegraph report states the situation:

Whole country between Poydras and Buras inundated. Levees gone, property loss appalling. Life toll probably heavy. Conditions estimated worse than ever before. Relief needed. No communications...

There were 23 dead in Venice, Louisiana, with similar numbers in coastal towns of Frenier and LaBranche. Plaquemines Parish experienced the worst fatalities with deaths estimated at over 200; the bodies of some victims were never found. In Plaquemines Parish, there was severe flooding and miles of levees were washed away. Thousands of people were left homeless. The hurricane also wrecked many of the oyster boats, damaging the local economy.

Some communities, including Breton Island and the town of Saint Malo, were completely destroyed.

Though it was not as deadly as the 1893 Chenier Caminanda hurricane, this hurricane was the deadliest Louisiana hurricane until Betsy 50 years later.

Alabama, Florida, and Mississippi
Early reports that streets in Biloxi, Mississippi were inundated under  were initially denied by Louisville and Nashville Railroad dispatchers. Mobile, Alabama did not experience significant damage as winds remained under , though storm surge A local train carrying relief supplies from Mobile was sent to affected areas, though most train service in the region was suspended.

See also

 List of Atlantic hurricanes
 List of Category 4 Atlantic hurricanes
 1909 Grand Isle hurricane – Deadly hurricane that struck similar areas of Louisiana, causing at least 400 deaths
 1926 Louisiana hurricane – Caused widespread damage across southern Louisiana
 Hurricane Hilda (1964) – Slow-moving and powerful hurricane that spawned several damaging tornadoes across Louisiana
 Hurricane Betsy (1965) – Made landfall in Louisiana as a powerful Category 4 hurricane, causing widespread damage
 Hurricane Katrina (2005) – Made landfall in southeastern Louisiana as a massive major hurricane, causing over 1000 deaths and becoming the costliest tropical cyclone on record
 Hurricane Ida (2021) – Destructive Category 4 hurricane that caused widespread damage in southeastern Louisiana

References

Further reading
.

External links

 1915 Hurricane - excerpts from contemporary local newspaper accounts
 The Hurricane of Sept. 29th, 1915, and Subsequent Heavy Rainfalls. New Orleans Sewerage & Water Board Report
Great Storm of 1915 track (Weather Underground)
Great Storm of 1915 track map (unisys)

1915 New Orleans
20th century in New Orleans
1915 New Orleans
New Orleans Hurricane, 1915
New Orleans Hurricane, 1915
New Orleans Hurricane